Alessandro Pizzamiglio (better known as  Alessandro Bono; 21 July 1964 – 15 May 1994) was an Italian singer-songwriter.

Life and career 
Born in  Milan, Bono started recording demos in 1983, under the production of Alberto Brioschi, and was also the first choice to record "Terra promessa", the song which eventually launched the career of Eros Ramazzotti. He made his official debut in 1985 as Alex Bono, entering the Festivalbar with the song "Walkie Talkie".

In 1987, Bono entered the newcomers competition at the 37th edition of the Sanremo Music Festival with "Nel mio profondo fondo". His debut self-titled album was producer by Mario Lavezzi and Mogol and was released in 1988,  receiving mostly favourable reviews from critics.

Between the late 1980s and the early 1990s, Bono was opening act in concerts of important artists such as Bob Dylan, Tracy Chapman, Francesco De Gregori, David Crosby and Gino Paoli.  He returned to compete at the Sanremo Music Festival in 1992 with a duet with Andrea Mingardi, "Con un amico vicino", and in 1994 with "Oppure no".

Bono died of AIDS on May 15, 1994, aged 29 years old. A tribute album was released in July 2015.

Discography
Album 
  
 1988 - Alessandro Bono (CBS)
 1991 - Caccia alla volpe (Sony Music)
 1994 - Oppure no (Sony Music)

References

External links 

 

Musicians from Milan
1964 births
1994 deaths
Italian male singer-songwriters
20th-century Italian male singers
AIDS-related deaths in Italy
Infectious disease deaths in Lombardy